Herberto Dumé (1929 – 8 April 2003) is best known for his theater direction.

Biography
Herberto Dumé was born in Matanzas, Cuba, in 1929 and graduated from the National Academy of the Performing Arts in 1950. He began his career as a theater director in 1955 and in 1959 became the director of the Teatro Nacional de Cuba, where he founded the theater company Grupo Guernica. Dumé left Cuba for exile in Spain in 1965 and soon after settled in New York.

In 1969, with the support and sponsorship of the New York State Council on the Arts, Dumé, José Corrales, and Edy Sánchez founded Dumé Spanish Theater in a small basement in the Greenwich Village area of New York City. The Dumé Spanish Theater staged plays in Spanish as well as poetry recitals, art exhibitions, lectures, and other cultural activities. When Dumé moved to Miami in 1978, Silvia Brito took over the Dumé Spanish Theater and renamed it Thalia Spanish Theatre.

Dumé is also known for his one-man poetry recitals. He staged plays by writers from Bernard Shaw and Henrik Ibsen to Cuban playwrights Abelardo Estorino, José Triana, and Virgilio Piñera. Dumé died on 8 April 2003, in Miami.

Notes and references

External links
 The Herberto Dumé papers are available at the Cuban Heritage Collection, University of Miami Libraries. The Herberto Dumé papers document the work of theater director Herberto Dumé (1929-2003) primarily during his years in exile from Cuba. The collection primarily includes the scripts of plays that Dumé directed along with photographs, clippings, programs, reviews, and records related to the Dumé Spanish Theater.
 Selected items from the Herberto Dumé papers are available through the University of Miami Libraries Digital Collections portal.
 Creator page for Herberto Dumé in the Cuban Theater Digital Archive
 Dumé Spanish Theater (WorldCat Identities).

1929 births
2003 deaths
Cuban theatre directors
Cuban dramatists and playwrights
Cuban male writers
Male dramatists and playwrights
Cuban emigrants to the United States
Exiles of the Cuban Revolution in the United States
20th-century dramatists and playwrights
Exiles of the Cuban Revolution in Spain
20th-century male writers